The San Bernardino Downtown Station, located at 390 West 5th Street, is the main post office serving San Bernardino, California. The post office was built in 1931 as part of the decade's federal construction programs; it is one of the few remaining buildings in San Bernardino which predates 1950. Architect Louis A. Simon designed the building, which incorporates a number of architectural styles. The general plan of the building is Beaux-Arts; however, the decorative details are inspired by the Mediterranean Revival and Italianate styles. The front of the building features an arcade with acanthus leaf capitals on the supporting columns and a second-floor porch. A red terra cotta tile roof tops the building.

The post office was added to the National Register of Historic Places on January 11, 1985.

See also 
List of United States post offices

References 

Post office buildings on the National Register of Historic Places in California
Italianate architecture in California
Beaux-Arts architecture in California
Government buildings completed in 1931
National Register of Historic Places in San Bernardino County, California
1931 establishments in California
History of San Bernardino, California
Buildings and structures in San Bernardino, California